George Washington Lindsay (March 28, 1865 – March 15, 1938) was an American businessman and politician who served six terms as a United States representative from New York from 1923 to 1935. He was the son of George Henry Lindsay, who was also a U.S. Representative.

Biography
He was born in Brooklyn on March 28, 1865 to George Henry Lindsay. He attended the public schools, was deputy Coroner of Kings County, New York from 1886 to 1892 (during which time his father was coroner) and engaged in the real estate business. He was a member of the Democratic State committee and served as leader of the assembly district from 1919 to 1934.

He was appointed as a confidential investigator in the State insurance department in 1914 and served until 1919. He was a member of the New York State Assembly (Kings Co., 13th D.) in 1920. He was deputy tenement-house commissioner for Brooklyn and Queens from 1921 to 1923.

Congress 
Lindsay was elected as a Democrat to the Sixty-eighth and to the five succeeding Congresses, holding office from March 4, 1923 to January 3, 1935. He was an unsuccessful candidate for renomination in 1934 and resumed the real estate business.

Death 
In 1938 he died in Brooklyn; interment was in Cemetery of the Evergreens.

References

External links

1865 births
Democratic Party members of the New York State Assembly
1938 deaths
Burials at the Cemetery of the Evergreens
Democratic Party members of the United States House of Representatives from New York (state)
American coroners
People from Brooklyn